Ian Yearsley is a local historian and author of books on the history of Essex.

History
Ian Yearsley was born in Ingatestone, Essex in 1965, moving to Southend-on-Sea, Essex in 1972. He started out as a journalist with the Leigh Times in 1988 before producing historical books on Essex, as well as poetry and fiction titles based on the county's history.

His first book, "Islands of Essex", was published in 1994. He has since written eleven books on the history of Essex, four works of fiction, three poetry books and the introductions to four historic maps, all based on Essex. His maps were published by Alan Godfrey in 2019.

In the 1990s Yearsley wrote for various magazines, including Essex Countryside and This Month in Essex, and he has been a regular commentator for local newspapers.

Yearsley was involved in the 1,000th anniversary commemorations of the Battle of Assandun at Ashingdon in Essex, following the publication of various editions of an epic poem he wrote about it between 2006 and 2016.

In 2011 he achieved an MA in history from the University of Essex, where he won an award for his dissertation on population migration in the Rochford Hundred in the late 19th century.

Yearsley has created historic tours of Essex and Suffolk for iPhone and has worked on a project to uncover the history of a lost Jacobean manor at Marks Hall near Coggeshall. He has also worked at Tilbury Fort for English Heritage.

He has associations with the Hadleigh & Thundersley Community Archive and has attended their events. He also recorded the demolition of St Erkenwald's Church in Southend-on-Sea in 1995.

Bibliography
1994 - Islands of Essex  Publisher: Ian Henry Publications
1996 - Dedham, Flatford & East Bergholt: A Pictorial History  Publisher: Phillimore & Co. Ltd.
1997 - Ingatestone & Fryerning: A History  Publisher: Ian Henry Publications
1998 - Hadleigh Past  Publisher: Phillimore & Co. Ltd 
1999 - Essex Events  Publisher: Phillimore & Co. Ltd
2000 - Islands of Essex (2nd Edition)  Publisher Ian Henry Publications
2001 - A History of Southend  Publisher: Phillimore & Co. Ltd  
2005 - Rayleigh A History  Publisher: Phillimore & Co. Ltd
2006 - Tears of Poignancy  Publisher: Paragon Publishing
2006 - The Battle of Ashingdon (1016)  Publisher: Ian Yearsley
2009 - Unspoken Understanding (a collection of thirty poems about love, life and Essex)  Publisher: Paragon Publishing
2012 - The Curse of Cannow's End  Publisher: Melrose Books 
2014 - The Blackwater Saga: A Victorian Riverside Romance   Publisher: Paragon Publishing
2014 - Looking for a Lost Leigh Love  Publisher: Paragon Publishing 
2016 - Southend in 50 Buildings  Publisher: Amberley Publishing 
2016 - The Battle of "Assandun" (1016) Publisher: Ashingdon Parish Council
2017 - Return to Cannow's End  Publisher: Paragon Publishing
2018 - Dracula – The Essex Connection  Publisher: Paragon Publishing
2019 - Old Ordnance Survey Maps - Southend Seafront 1921  Publisher: Alan Godfrey Maps
2019 - Old Ordnance Survey Maps - Southend (Town Centre) 1921  Publisher: Alan Godfrey Maps
2019 - Old Ordnance Survey Maps - Leigh-on-Sea 1921  Publisher: Alan Godfrey Maps
2019 - Old Ordnance Survey Maps - Westcliff-on-Sea 1921  Publisher: Alan Godfrey Maps

References

1965 births
People from Southend-on-Sea
21st-century English writers
20th-century English historians
21st-century English historians
Living people